VP16 may refer to: 
 Herpes simplex virus protein vmw65, a viral protein
 Etoposide, also known as VP-16-213, an anticancer drug
 VP-16 (U.S. Navy), a Patrol Squadron of the U.S. Navy